Enteromius macinensis is a species of ray-finned fish in the genus Enteromius from West Africa.

References 

 

Enteromius
Fish described in 1954
Taxa named by Jacques Daget